Sherman is a surname that originated in the Anglo-Saxon language. It means a "shearer of woolen garments", being derived from the words scearra, or "shears", and mann, or "man". The name is cognate with Sharman, Shearman and Shurman. Sherman has also been regularly used as a given name in the United States. This was probably originally in honor of Roger Sherman, though after the Civil War William Tecumseh Sherman was also an influence.

People with the surname
The Sherman Brothers, American songwriting duo
Adelmorn Sherman (1820–1875), American farmer and politician
Ahuva Sherman (born 1926), Israeli artist 
Al Sherman (1897–1973), American songwriter
Alan Sherman (born 1957), American computer scientist
Alex Sherman (born 1984), Moldovan professional wrestler under the ring name Alex Koslov
Sir Alfred Sherman (1919–2006), British journalist
Aliza Sherman (born 1964), entrepreneur, author, women's issues activist and lecturer
Allan Sherman (1924–1973), American comedian
Allie Sherman (born 1923), American NFL football player and coach
Alpheus Sherman (1780–1866), New York politician
Althea Sherman (1853–1943)), American illustrator, educator, ornithologist and writer
Amy Sherman-Palladino (born 1966), American television writer, director and producer 
 Art Sherman (born 1937), American horse trainer and jockey
Ben Sherman (1925–1987, born Arthur Benjamin Sugarman), British clothing company founder
Bernard Sherman (1942–2017), Canadian businessman
Bim Sherman (1950–2000), Jamaican musician and singer-songwriter
Bob Sherman (actor) (1940–2004), American dramaturge, playwright and film and television actor
Bobby Sherman (born 1943), American singer and actor
Brad Sherman (born 1954), U.S. congressman from California
Buren R. Sherman (1836–1904), Governor of Iowa
Carl Sherman (c. 1891–1956), New York State Attorney General 1923–24
Carlos Sherman (1934–2005), Belarusian translator and writer
Charles Robert Sherman (1788–1829), American lawyer and public servant
Charles Taylor Sherman (1811–1879), Ohio lawyer and judge
Chase Sherman (born 1989), UFC Fighter
Cindy Sherman (born 1954), American artist
David Sherman  (born 1958), American novelist
Elna Sherman (1888-1964) American composer and musicologist
Forrest Sherman (1896–1951), United States Navy admiral
Francis Cornwall Sherman (1805–1870), American politician
Francis Trowbridge Sherman (1825–1905) United States Army general
Frederick C. Sherman (1888–1957), admiral of the United States Navy
Gary Sherman (director) (born 1945), American film director
Gary Sherman (Wisconsin politician) (born 1949), Wisconsin jurist and legislator
Gene Sherman (disambiguation), a number of people
George Sherman (1908–1991), American film director
Geraldine M. Sherman (1922–2012), Native American fashion designer
Harry Sherman (1884–1952), American film producer
Henry Clapp Sherman (1875–1955), American food chemist and nutritionist
Henry L. Sherman (1870–1938), American lawyer and judge
Hilde Sherman (1923–2011), German Holocaust survivor and memoirist.
Jack Sherman (1956–2020), American studio guitarist 
Jack Sherman (statistician)
James Sherman (comics), American comic book artist
James Sherman (cricketer) (1791–1831), English cricketer
James Sherman (minister) (1796–1862), British Congregationalist and abolitionist
James Morgan Sherman (1890–1956), American bacteriologist and dairy scientist
James Schoolcraft Sherman (1855–1912), 27th Vice President of the United States
Jane Sherman (1908–2010)  American writer, performer and Rockette
John Sherman (clergyman) (1772–1828), American Unitarian pastor
John Sherman (climber) (born 1959), American climber
John Sherman (cricketer) (1788–1861), English cricketer
John Sherman (Ohio) (1823–1900), U.S. Representative and U.S. Senator from Ohio
Joseph Sherman (1945–2006), Canadian poet and visual arts editor
Joseph J. Sherman (born 1980), American marketing strategist and artist
Judson W. Sherman (1808–1881), U.S. Representative from New York
Justin Sherman (born 1987), Australian rules footballer
Lawrence W. Sherman (born 1949), academic criminologist
Lawrence Yates Sherman (1858–1939), American politician from Illinois
Lowell Sherman (1885–1934), American actor and film director
Lyman R. Sherman (1804–1839), an early leader in the Latter Day Saint movement
Martin Sherman (born 1938), American screenwriter and playwright
Martin Sherman (actor), American actor in films and video games
Max Sherman (born 1935), Texas politician
Max Sherman (Ontario politician), Canadian businessperson and politician
Mike Sherman (born 1954), American football coach
Moses Sherman (1853–1932) American land and transportation developer
Najahe Sherman, American television news anchor and reporter
Philip Sherman (1610–1687), Rhode Island pioneer
Raj Sherman (born 1966), Canadian politician
Ransom Sherman (born 1898), American radio and television personality and writer
Ray Sherman (born 1951), American football player and coach
Richard Sherman (born 1988) American football cornerback
Richard M. Sherman (born 1928), American songwriter, half of the Sherman Brothers
Richard Updike Sherman (1819–1895), New York State politician and newspaper publisher/editor
Robert B. Sherman (1925–2012), American songwriter, half of the Sherman Brothers
Robert J. Sherman (born 1968), American songwriter, son of Robert B. Sherman
Roger Sherman (1721–1793), American lawyer and politician
Roger Sherman (American football) (1872–1957), American football player, coach and lawyer
Russell Sherman (born 1930), American classical pianist
Ruth Sherman (1903–1965), American bridge player
Socrates N. Sherman (1801–1873), American politician
Stuart Sherman (1881–1926), American literary critic
Teddi Sherman (1921–2019), American actress
Tom Sherman (American football) (born 1950), American football player
Tom Sherman (cricketer) (1825–1911), English cricketer
Thomas Ewing Sherman (1856–1933), American lawyer and priest
Thomas W. Sherman (1813–1879), United States Army officer
Vincent Sherman (1906–2006), American film director and actor
Wendy Sherman, American diplomat
Will Sherman (1927–1997), American football player
William Sherman (disambiguation), multiple people

People with the given name
 Sherman Adams (1899–1986), American politician, White House Chief of Staff for President Dwight D. Eisenhower and Governor of New Hampshire
 Sherman Alexie (born 1966), American writer, poet, filmmaker and comedian
 Sherman Augustus, American actor
 Sherman Austin, American anarchist and musician
 Sherman Barton (1875–1947), outfielder in the Negro leagues
 Sherman Bell, controversial leader of the Colorado National Guard during the Colorado Labor Wars of 1903–04
 Sherman A. Bernard (1925–2012), American businessman
 Sherman Billingsley (1900–1966), American former bootlegger and founder and owner of New York's Stork Club nightclub
 Sherman Block (1924–1998), 29th Sheriff of Los Angeles County, California
 Sherman Booth (1812–1904), American abolitionist, editor, and politician
 Sherman Chaddlestone (born 1947), Native American painter
 Sherman Chung, Hong Kong cantopop singer
 Sherman Dillard, former American basketball player
 Sherman Douglas (born 1966), retired National Basketball Association player
 Sherman Dreiseszun (1922–2007), American banker and real estate developer 
 Sherman Edwards (1919–1981), American songwriter 
 Sherman Fairchild (1896–1971), inventor and entrepreneur who founded over 70 companies
 Sherman Feller (1918–1994), American musical composer and radio personality
 Sherman Hemsley (1938–2012), American actor
 Sherman Howard (born 1949), American actor
 Sherman Kwek (born 1975/76), Singaporean businessman
 Sherman McMaster (1853–1892?), American outlaw turned lawman
 Sherman Minton (1890–1965), American politician and judge
 Sherman A. Minton (1919–1999), American herpetologist and toxicologist
 Sherman Moreland (1868–1951), New York politician and Philippine Supreme Court justice
 Sherman Parker (1971–2008), American politician
 Sherman E. Smalley (1866–1958), American politician and jurist

People with the middle name

Joseph Sherman Frelinghuysen, Sr. (1869–1948), American Senator
Walter Sherman Gifford (1885–1966), American president of the AT&T Corporation
Ulysses Sherman Grant (1867–1932), American geologist
Robert Sherman Halperin (1928–1985), yachting Olympic and Pan American Games medalist, football player, World War II hero, and chairman of Commercial Light Co.
Roger Sherman Hoar (1887–1963), American politician and author
William Sherman Jennings (1863–1920), American lawyer, judge, and politician
C. Sherman King, American football coach
Harry Sherman Longley (1868–1944), American Episcopal bishop
Theodore Sherman Palmer (1868–1955), American zoologist
Eleanor Sherman Thackara (1859–1915), American daughter of General William Tecumseh Sherman

Fictional characters
 Ben Sherman (Southland)
 Chuck Sherman, from American Pie
 Liz Sherman, in the Hellboy comic book series
 Jalil Sherman, from Everworld
 Jay Sherman, the main character in The Critic
 Sherman, pet boy of the dog Mister Peabody on The Rocky and Bullwinkle Show
 Sherman, the eponymous character in Sherman's Lagoon
 Sherman, a recurring character in Nickelodeon's The Backyardigans
 Sherman Klump, the title character from The Nutty Professor
 Sherman McCoy, the protagonist of Tom Wolfe's The Bonfire of the Vanities
 Sherman Tortoise, in The Dandy
 Sherman the Turtle Tank, one of the toys in Noddy
 Sherman T. Potter, from M*A*S*H
 Professor Sherman Vermin, from Dr. Zitbag's Transylvania Pet Shop
 Tommy Sherman, in Daria

See also
Sherman (disambiguation)
Sharman
Shearman (disambiguation)
Scherman (surname)
Shurman

 
Given names
English-language surnames
Occupational surnames
English-language occupational surnames